Adam Edward Nicholas Riley (born 23 March 1992) is an English former professional cricketer who played for Kent County Cricket Club between 2011 and 2019. Riley played as an off break bowler who also played for the England Lions team and for Loughborough MCC University.

Early life
Riley was born at Sidcup in the London Borough of Bexley. He was educated at Beths Grammar School in Bexley before studying Geography and Sports Management at Loughborough University. He played cricket for both Kent and the Loughborough MCC University team whilst a student.

Cricket career
Riley made his first-class cricket debut for Kent against Northamptonshire in the 2011 County Championship. He took his maiden first-class five wicket haul against Loughborough MCCU, taking figures of 5/76 during the season. Riley also made his List A cricket debut against Worcestershire in the 2011 Clydesdale Bank 40. as well as his Twenty20 cricket debut against the touring Indians.

In June 2013, Riley took seven wickets for 150 runs in a County Championship match against Hampshire.

Riley left Kent by "mutual consent" in June 2019 after nine seasons with the county. The England coaching setup had intervened to change his delivery during a training camp in 2015 and, despite a number of attempts to revert to his previous, effective action, which was described as having been "very fluid" with "the ability to bowl spin with good pace, control, guile, dip", he had been unable to recover his form. After leaving county cricket he moved to work at Dulwich College as its head of player development at the end of 2019 as well as continuing to work coaching Kent's under-15 side.

Career Best Performances

References

External links

1992 births
Living people
People from Sidcup
English cricketers
Kent cricketers
Loughborough MCCU cricketers
Marylebone Cricket Club cricketers